Erastes tou oneirou is a 1974 Greek comedy film directed and written by Giannis Dalianidis.  Dimitris (Dimitris Papamihail) carried away from his brother and went to robbed a villa in which Zoi (Zoi Laskari) lives and that made their recognition of their romance.  The movie made 70,456 tickets.

Cast

Zoe Laskari - Zoitsa Kyriazi
Dimitris Papamichael - Dimitris Karathanasis
Titika Stasinopoulou - Katina
Lefteris Vournas - Lefteris Kyriazis
Nikos Dadinopoulos - Christos Sotiriou
Lydia Lenosi
Ilya Livykou - Georgette Kyriazi
Kaiti Ibrochori - Ermina

See also
List of Greek films

External links

1974 films
1974 comedy films
1970s Greek-language films
Greek comedy films
Films directed by Giannis Dalianidis